Thin Line is the fourteenth studio album by country singer Billy Ray Cyrus, and his second on own record label Blue Cadillac Music. It was released on September 9, 2016. The album peaked at #49 on the Country Charts.

Track listing

Personnel
Musicians

 Bryan Adams – vocals on "Hey Elvis"
 Russell Ali – electric guitar on "Lovin' Her Was Easier (Than Anything I'll Ever Do Again)" and "Going Where the Lonely Go"
 William von Arx – lead guitar on "Stop Pickin' on Willie"
 Anthony Braunagle – drums
 Alexander Burke – keyboards, mandolin, piano
 Stewart Cararas – electric guitar, bass guitar, percussion (Tracks 2, 4, 5, 6, 7, 13, 14) 
 Billy Ray Cyrus – acoustic guitar, percussion, Tibetan bowls, lead vocals
 Braison Cyrus – electric guitar and vocals on "Going Where the Lonely Go"
 Miley Cyrus – percussion, Tibetan bowls, and vocals on "Angels Protect This Home"
 Jamie Douglass – drums, percussion
 Brandon Friesen – bass guitar, acoustic guitar, electric guitar, keyboards, percussion, piano
 Rebekkah Friesen – acoustic guitar, background vocals
 Tony Furtado – banjo
 Cynthia Gillet – bass guitar, background vocals
 Noah Gordon – background vocals
 Angella Grossi – percussion
 Adam Hall – banjo, dobro, lap steel guitar
 Zach Hall – bass guitar on "Tulsa Time"
 Michael "Fish" Herring – electric guitar
 Kenley Shae Holm – vocals on "Help Me Make It Through the Night"
 Glenn Hughes – vocals on "Hey Elvis" and "Hope (Let It Find You)"
 Angela Hurt – background vocals
 Shooter Jennings – acoustic guitar, electric guitar, Hammond organ, piano, programming, producer, vocals on "Killing the Blues" and "I've Always Been Crazy"
 Ted Russell Kamp – bass guitar
 Peter Keys – keyboards, piano 
 Jeff King – electric guitar
 Johnny Lee – acoustic guitar
 Shelby Lynne – vocals on "Thin Line" and "Sunday Morning Coming Down"
 Reggie McBride – bass guitar
 Jason Charles Miller – bass guitar, acoustic guitar, electric guitar, keyboards, percussion, background vocals (Tracks 2, 4, 5, 6, 7, 13, 14)
 Ian Newbill – electric guitar on "My Heroes Have Always Been Cowboys"
 Lee Roy Parnell – slide guitar on "I've Always Been Crazy"
 Joe Perry – electric guitar on "Tulsa Time"
 Mark Plummer – background vocals on "Tulsa Time"
 Jimmy Pugh – Hammond organ, piano
 David Rehmann – drums
 Aubrey Richmond – fiddle
 Andrew Rollins – bass guitar, acoustic guitar, electric guitar, background vocals on "Hope (Let It Find You)"
 Wendy Starland – background vocals
 The Tambourine Brothers – tambourine
 Drew Taubenfeld – pedal steel guitar
 Cliff Wagner – banjo, fiddle

Technical

 Neil Baldock – engineer
 Geoff Bisente – assistant engineer, engineer
 Stewart Cararas – producer, engineer, mixer (Tracks 2, 4, 5, 6, 7, 13, 14), additional engineering/production (Tracks 1, 8, 12,)
 Billy Ray Cyrus – engineer, producer
 Billy Decker – mixing
 Jim DeMain – mastering
 Brandon Friesen – engineer, mixing, producer, programming
 Noah Gordon – editing, producer
 Ben Grafton – assistant engineer
 Casey Henderson – assistant engineer
 Derek Jones – assistant engineer
 Shim Kratky – assistant engineer
 Jason Charles Miller – producer (Tracks 2, 4, 5, 6, 7, 13, 14), additional engineering/production (Tracks 1, 8, 12,)
 Jimmy Plann – drum programming, engineer
 Andrew Rollins – producer

Charts

References

2016 albums
Billy Ray Cyrus albums